

Anton-Detlev von Plato (6 June 1910 – 12 October 2001) was a German officer in the Wehrmacht during World War II and a general in the Bundeswehr.  He was a recipient of the Knight's Cross of the Iron Cross of Nazi Germany.

Awards and decorations

 Knight's Cross of the Iron Cross on 19 August 1944 as Oberstleutnant im Generalstab and Ia (operations officer) in the 5. Panzer-Division

References

Citations

Bibliography

 

1910 births
2001 deaths
People from Lüchow-Dannenberg
People from the Province of Hanover
Lieutenant generals of the German Army
Bundeswehr generals
Reichswehr personnel
Recipients of the Gold German Cross
Recipients of the Knight's Cross of the Iron Cross
Knights Commander of the Order of Merit of the Federal Republic of Germany
Military personnel from Lower Saxony